GE True (also known as General Electric True) is a 33-episode, American anthology series sponsored by General Electric. Telecast on CBS, the series presented stories previously published in True magazine.  Articles from the magazine were adapted to television primarily by head writer Harold Jack Bloom; other writers included Gene Roddenberry, who co-wrote one episode.  Jack Webb produced and hosted the episodes during his stint as head of Warner Bros. Television, through his Mark VII Limited company. 

The series aired from September 30, 1962, until May 26, 1963, with repeats through September 1963.

Program overview
The show had a unique opening: A huge "True" sign, apparently five stories tall, darkened, was seen in deep shadows. Jack Webb announced, "This is True!" Strong symphonic music included timpani rhythms, followed by the majestic opening theme. The True sign became brightly lit as Webb walked alongside the illuminated sign in an off-stage direction. A classic quotation from such figures as Daniel Webster then appeared.

In an overview of the 1962 television season, Time noted:

Jack ("dum-de-dum-dum") Webb is back. This time he is retelling stories from the files of True magazine. The first one was set on a hospital ship off Okinawa, where a doctor (played by William Conrad) operated on a marine who had a live and sensitive shell in his body capable of blowing a six-foot hole in a steel deck. It was a hell of a moment, but Webb sank it. "At 1830 hours exactly," he intoned, "the operation began on a human bomb dead center in the circle of death." He hosts the program in an echo-chambered voice, while he stands beside the word TRUE, spelled out in block letters 22 feet high, or roughly 10 times as tall as Jack Webb.

GE True aired at 9:30 pm Sundays, following the last season of the former ABC sitcom, The Real McCoys, starring Walter Brennan and Richard Crenna, renamed on the CBS schedule as The McCoys. GE True aired a half-hour later than a predecessor series, General Electric Theater, hosted by Ronald W. Reagan, which at had aired at 9 pm from 1953 to 1962.

Several episodes were directed by William Conrad, Marshal Matt Dillon on radio's  Gunsmoke and later the star of the CBS crime drama, Cannon. Like its preceding program, The McCoys, GE True faced opposition from the highly rated NBC Western series, Bonanza. Reruns of the series were subsequently syndicated under the title True.

In 2013, the Jack Webb Fan Club of Los Angeles started a campaign to get the series released on DVD.

Selected episodes
In "Open Season" (January 6, 1963), James Best portrays the courageous Wisconsin game warden Ernie Swift, who faces the reprisal of the mob after he tickets gangster Frank MacErlane (David McLean) for illegal fishing.

In "Defendant: Clarence Darrow" (January 13, 1963), Clarence Darrow (Tol Avery), the Chicago lawyer who later clashed with William Jennings Bryan in regard to the theory of evolution, is accused in 1912 of having attempted to bribe a juror. Darrow argues passionately over legal procedures with his own lawyer, Earl Rogers (Robert Vaughn).

In the episode "Firebug" (January 27, 1963), Victor Buono plays Charles Colvin, a barber in Los Angeles, who is by night a pyromaniac. The United States Forest Service believes that one arsonist is causing a series of fires. The episode also stars Keith Andes and Arch Johnson.

In "The Moonshiners" (February 24, 1963), Walter Kopek (Gene Evans), an agent of the United States Treasury Department assumes an undercover role to halt a bootlegging operation in Florida, run by  mobster Bill Munger (Robert Emhardt). James Griffith is cast in this episode as Stan Woolman.

In the three-part episode "Security Risk", George Ellsworth, played by Charles Aidman, an official with the United States Embassy in Warsaw, Poland, in 1960, is blackmailed through a romantic affair with a young woman named Erica (Erika Peters) into passing secret information to the communists at the height of the Cold War. He confessed his guilt despite the protection of diplomatic immunity. Karl Swenson and Parley Baer also appeared in this episode.

In "A Pattern for Espionage", United States Army Colonel Harvey Madison (Rex Reason), is approached by a former Russian comrade-in-arms to spy for the communists. Instead, he covertly cooperates with the Federal Bureau of Investigation to uncover a spy ring operated by the former Soviet Union. Anthony Eisley and Gregory Walcott also appeared in this episode.
 
In "The Tenth Mona Lisa" (1963), Italian farmer Vincenzo Perugia (Vito Scotti) in 1911 steals the Mona Lisa from the Louvre Museum in Paris, but is apprehended by a French detective when he attempts to unload the painting on an art dealer.

In the two-part 1963 episode "Heydrich", two Czech sergeants assassinate Nazi hangman Reinhard Heydrich; Chancellor of the Third Reich Adolf Hitler takes revenge on an entire village in his search for the sergeants.

In "Five Tickets to Hell", the series finale, John Quigley (Bing Russell), a Chicago mobster travels to Chihuahua, Mexico, where he robs the mint of $500,000 and kills seven men in the commission of the crime. Police Lieutenant Juan Garcia (Carlos Romero) tracks down Quigley and his three accomplices. Barbara Luna appears in this episode as Cotita.

Though several sources state the Jack Webb-hosted short film "Red Nightmare" aired as an episode of GE True, contemporary sources do not back this up.  (As well, as "Red Nightmare" was explicitly presented as a fantasy and not a true story, it would not fit the format of the show.)

Guest stars
In addition to the aforementioned, others who guest starred on GE True include:

 Anna-Lisa
 Philip Abbott
 Lloyd Bochner
 James T. Callahan
 Philip Carey
 James Doohan
 Don Dubbins
 Ron Foster
 David Frankham
 James Griffith
 Kevin Hagen
 Stacy Harris
 Jonathan Hole
 Arte Johnson

 Russell Johnson
 Werner Klemperer
 Robert Knapp
 Sean McClory
 James Millhollin
 Mort Mills
 Jeanette Nolan
 Albert Paulsen
 Chris Robinson
 Jacqueline Scott
 Malachi Throne
 Jerry Van Dyke
 Pat Woodell
 Simon Scott

Episodes

References

External links 
 

1962 American television series debuts
1963 American television series endings
1960s American anthology television series
Black-and-white American television shows
CBS original programming
English-language television shows
General Electric sponsorships
Television series by Mark VII Limited
Television series by Warner Bros. Television Studios
Television shows based on magazines